People's (National) Teacher is an honorary title and  may refer to:

 People's Teacher of the USSR
 People's Teacher of the Russian Federation
 People's Teacher of Tatarstan
 People's Teacher of Ukraine
 People's Teacher of Uzbekistan
 People's Teacher of Albania
 

Honorary titles